Branislav Sekáč (born 3 September 1979) is a former professional tennis player from Slovakia.

Biography
Sekáč was born in Bratislava and attended the local University of Physical Education and Sports before turning professional.

His professional appearances were restricted to the Futures and Challenger circuits. In 2002 he won three Futures singles titles to halve his ranking from outside the top 600 at the start of the year to end the year at 271.

He made the second round of qualifying at the 2003 Australian Open and won three Challenger doubles titles.

As a coach he has been a staff member at the NTC in Bratislava and has acted as the personal coach of Kristína Schmiedlová.

Challenger titles

Doubles: (3)

See also
List of Slovakia Davis Cup team representatives

References

External links
 
 

1979 births
Living people
Slovak male tennis players
Tennis players from Bratislava